The Avengers is the name of several comic book titles featuring the team the Avengers and published by Marvel Comics, beginning with the original The Avengers comic book series which debuted in 1963.

Publication history

In 1960, DC Comics launched a comic book series featuring a team of superheroes called the Justice League.  Impressed by that book's strong sales, Martin Goodman, the owner of Marvel Comics predecessor Timely Comics, asked Stan Lee to create a title featuring a similar team of superheroes for Marvel. Lee recounts in Origins of Marvel Comics:

Much like the Justice League, the Avengers were an assemblage of pre-existing superhero characters created by Lee and Jack Kirby. Kirby did the artwork for the first eight issues only, in addition to doing the layouts for issues #14–16. This initial series, published bi-monthly through issue #6 (July 1964) and monthly thereafter, ran through issue #402 (Sept. 1996), with spinoffs including several annuals, miniseries and a giant-size quarterly sister series that ran briefly in the mid-1970s. Marvel filed for a trademark for "The Avengers" in 1967 and the United States Patent and Trademark Office issued the registration in 1970.

Between 1996 and 2004, Marvel relaunched the primary Avengers title three times. In 1996, the "Heroes Reborn" line, in which Marvel contracted outside companies to produce four titles, included a new volume of The Avengers. It took place in an alternate universe, with a revamped history unrelated to mainstream Marvel continuity. The Avengers vol. 2 was written by Rob Liefeld and penciled by Jim Valentino, and ran for 13 issues (Nov. 1996–Nov. 1997). The final issue, which featured a crossover with the other Heroes Reborn titles, returned the characters to the main Marvel Universe.

The Avengers vol. 3 relaunched and ran for 84 issues from February 1998 to August 2004. To coincide with what would have been the 500th issue of the original series, Marvel changed the numbering, and The Avengers #500-503 (Sept.– Dec. 2004), the one-shot Avengers Finale (Jan. 2005) became the "Avengers Disassembled" storyline and final issues. Avengers vol. 4 debuted in July 2010 and ran until January 2013. Vol. 5 was launched in February 2013. After Secret Wars, a new Avengers team debuted, dubbed the All-New, All-Different Avengers, starting with a Free Comic Book Day preview.

1960s

In the first issue, the Avengers team began with Ant-Man (Hank Pym), Hulk (Bruce Banner), Iron Man (Anthony Stark), Thor, and the Wasp (Janet van Dyne). The roster changed almost immediately after the first issue; in the second issue, Ant-Man became Giant-Man, and at the end of the issue, Hulk quit the team. Issue #4 brought the title's first major milestone: the revival and return of Captain America (Steve Rogers).

1970s
The creative team of writer Roy Thomas and artist John Buscema introduced new characters such as Arkon in issue #75 (April 1970) and Red Wolf in #80 (Sept. 1970). The team's adventures increased in scope as the team crossed into an alternate dimension and battled the Squadron Supreme, and fought in the Kree-Skrull War, which guest-starred the Kree hero, Mar-Vell/Captain Marvel. Novelist Harlan Ellison plotted two stories for the series. The first ("The Summons of Psyklop") was published in issue #88 (May 1971) and the second ("Five Dooms to Save Tomorrow") in #101 (July 1972).

Writer Steve Englehart introduced Mantis, who joined the team along with the reformed Swordsman.

During the summer of 1973, Englehart and artists Bob Brown and Sal Buscema produced "The Avengers-Defenders Clash" storyline which crossed over between the two team titles. This eight-issue story was the first summertime cross-title event, and was very popular with readers.

George Pérez became the title's artist with issue #141 (Nov. 1975) which saw the start of a seven-part story featuring the Squadron Supreme and the Serpent Crown. In 2010, Comics Bulletin ranked Englehart's run on The Avengers eighth on its list of the "Top 10 1970s Marvels".

After Englehart departed and a seven-issue stint by Gerry Conway, Jim Shooter began as writer, generating several classic adventures, including "The Bride of Ultron", the "Nefaria Trilogy", and "The Korvac Saga". Shooter introduced the character of Henry Peter Gyrich, the Avengers' liaison to the United States National Security Council. The true origins of Quicksilver and the Scarlet Witch were revealed in a three-part story that ran in issues #185-187 (July-Sept. 1979).

1980s
The first major development was the breakdown of Henry Pym, which writer Roger Stern resolved this by having Pym outwit Egghead and defeated the latest incarnation of the Masters of Evil single-handedly, and proved his innocence.

Stern developed several major storylines, such as "Ultimate Vision"; the formation of the West Coast Avengers; and "Avengers Under Siege". Rogue, who would later become a member of the X-Men, was introduced in The Avengers Annual #10 (1981) by writer Chris Claremont and artist Michael Golden.

Stern created the villain, Nebula, who falsely claimed to be the granddaughter of Thanos. Following Stern's departure, Walt Simonson wrote the series briefly but left due to editorial conflicts.

John Byrne took over writing both West Coast Avengers and The Avengers and merged the two separate Avengers teams into one team with two bases. Byrne's contributions included a revamping of the Vision, and the discovery that the children of the Scarlet Witch and the Vision were actually illusions. The Avengers titles in late 1989 were involved in the major crossover event "Acts of Vengeance".

1990s

Bob Harras and Steve Epting took over the title in the summer of 1991 and introduced a stable lineup with ongoing story lines and character development. Their primary antagonists in this run were the mysterious Proctor and his team of other-dimensional Avengers known as the Gatherers.

This culminated in "Operation: Galactic Storm", a 19-part storyline that ran through all Avengers-related titles and showcased a conflict between the Kree and the Shi'ar Empire.

Marvel contracted out The Avengers and three related titles — Captain America, Fantastic Four, and Iron Man to former Marvel artists Jim Lee and Rob Liefeld, two of the founding creators of Image Comics. While The Avengers was relaunched as a new series, the "Heroes Reborn" line ended after a year as planned and the license reverted to Marvel.

Writer Kurt Busiek and penciler George Pérez launched a new volume of the series with The Avengers vol. 3, #1 (Feb. 1998). Busiek concurrently wrote the limited series Avengers Forever. Busiek's run included many of the Avengers' traditional villains.

2000s
Successor writer Geoff Johns dealt with the aftermath of Busiek's Kang arc, as the Avengers were granted international authority by the United Nations. Chuck Austen followed as writer. Writer Brian Michael Bendis then rebooted the series with the "Avengers Disassembled" storyline.

2010s

All four Avengers series (The Mighty Avengers, New Avengers, Dark Avengers, and Avengers: The Initiative) were canceled, and a new ongoing series titled Avengers was launched in May 2010, written by Brian Michael Bendis and penciled by John Romita Jr.

In 2012, a biweekly Avengers title was launched, written by Jonathan Hickman and drawn by different artists for each story arc. After Secret Wars, a new Avengers title (vol. 6) dubbed the All-New, All-Different Avengers launched in 2015 written by Mark Waid, with alternating artwork by Mahmud Asrar and Adam Kubert, and covers by Alex Ross. Mark Waid and Alex Ross continued with Avengers vol. 7, which launched in 2017, with artwork by Mike del Mundo.

It was relaunched once again in 2018 as part of Marvel's "Fresh Start" relaunch featuring a creative by Jason Aaron (w) and Ed McGuinness (pen).

Collected editions

The Avengers (1963 series)

Avengers Vol. 2 (1996)

Avengers Vol. 3 (1998)

Avengers Vol. 4 (2010)

Avengers Vol. 5 (2013)

Avengers Vol. 6: All-New, All-Different Avengers (2015)

Avengers Vol. 7: Avengers Unleashed (2017)

Avengers Vol. 8 (2018)

Notes

References

1963 comics debuts
 
Comics adapted into animated series
Comics by Brian Michael Bendis
Comics by David Michelinie
Comics by Geoff Johns
Comics by George Pérez
Comics by Gerry Conway
Comics by J. M. DeMatteis
Comics by Jason Aaron
Comics by John Byrne (comics)
Comics by Jonathan Hickman
Comics by Kurt Busiek
Comics by Mark Waid
Comics by Neal Adams
Comics by Roger Stern
Comics by Roy Thomas
Comics by Stan Lee
Comics by Steve Englehart
Comics by Walt Simonson
Marvel Comics adapted into films
Marvel Comics titles
Superhero comics